The U.S. National Academy of Engineering annually awards the Draper Prize, which is given for the advancement of engineering and the education of the public about engineering. It is one of three prizes that constitute the "Nobel Prizes of Engineering" — the others are the Academy's Russ and Gordon Prizes. The Draper Prize is awarded biennially and the winner of each of these prizes receives $500,000. The Draper prize is named for Charles Stark Draper, the "father of inertial navigation", an MIT professor and founder of Draper Laboratory.

Past winners
 1989: Jack S. Kilby and Robert N. Noyce for their independent development of the monolithic integrated circuit
 1991: Sir Frank Whittle and Hans von Ohain for their independent development of the turbojet engine
 1993: John Backus for his development of FORTRAN, the first widely used, general purpose, high-level computer language
 1995: John R. Pierce and Harold A. Rosen for their development of communication satellite technology
 1997: Vladimir Haensel for his invention of "platforming"
 1999: Charles K. Kao, Robert D. Maurer, and John B. MacChesney for the development of fiber optics
 2001: Vinton G. Cerf, Robert E. Kahn, Leonard Kleinrock, and Lawrence G. Roberts for the development of the Internet
 2002: Robert Langer for the bioengineering of revolutionary medical drug delivery systems
 2003: Ivan A. Getting and Bradford W. Parkinson for their work developing the Global Positioning System
 2004: Alan C. Kay, Butler W. Lampson, Robert W. Taylor, and Charles P. Thacker for their work on Alto, the first practical networked computer
 2006: Willard S. Boyle and George E. Smith for the invention of the charge-coupled device (CCD), a light-sensitive component at the heart of digital cameras and other widely used imaging technologies
 2007: Tim Berners-Lee for developing the World Wide Web
 2008: Rudolf E. Kálmán for developing the Kalman filter
 2009: Robert H. Dennard for his invention and contributions to the development of Dynamic Random Access Memory (DRAM), used universally in computers and other data processing and communication systems
 2011: Frances H. Arnold and Willem P.C. Stemmer for their individual contributions to directed evolution, a process which allows researchers to guide the creation of certain properties in proteins and cells. This technique has been used in food ingredients, pharmaceuticals, toxicology, agricultural products, gene delivery systems, laundry aids, and biofuels
 2012: George H. Heilmeier, Wolfgang Helfrich, Martin Schadt, and T. Peter Brody for their contributions to the development of liquid crystal display (LCD) technologies
 2013: Thomas Haug, Martin Cooper, Yoshihisa Okumura (奥村 善久), Richard H. Frenkiel, and Joel S. Engel – mobile phone pioneers who laid the groundwork for cellular telephone networks (GSM) and today's smartphone.
 2014: John Goodenough,  (西 美緒), Rachid Yazami and Akira Yoshino (吉野 彰) – rechargeable battery pioneers who laid the groundwork for today's lithium ion battery.
 2015: Isamu Akasaki, M. George Craford, Russell Dupuis, Nick Holonyak, Jr. and Shuji Nakamura for the invention, development, and commercialization of materials and processes for light-emitting diodes (LEDs).
 2016: Andrew J. Viterbi for development of the Viterbi algorithm, its transformational impact on digital wireless communications, and its significant applications in speech recognition and synthesis and in bioinformatics.
 2018: Bjarne Stroustrup for conceptualizing and developing the C++ programming language.
 2020: Jean Fréchet and C. Grant Willson for the invention, development, and commercialization of chemically amplified materials for micro- and nanofabrication, enabling the extreme miniaturization of microelectronic devices. 
 2022: Steve B. Furber, John L. Hennessy, David A. Patterson and Sophie M. Wilson for contributions to the invention, development, and implementation of reduced instruction set computer (RISC) chips.
The NAE website shows that no Draper Prize was awarded in 2010, 2017, 2019 or 2021. Since the award is a biennial one, it was probably only given in even years beginning in 2016. The Russ Prize, also from the NAE, is awarded in odd years.

See also

 List of engineering awards

References

Draper Prize winners
Awards of the United States National Academy of Engineering
International awards